Molesme is a commune in the Côte-d'Or department in eastern France.

History
Molesme grew up round the Benedictine monastery of Molesme Abbey, established here in the late 11th century by Saint Robert, who later founded Cîteaux Abbey, motherhouse of the Cistercian Order, with a group of monks from Molesme.

Population

See also
Communes of the Côte-d'Or department

References

Communes of Côte-d'Or